Barbara Smith (born 1946) is an American lesbian feminist writer.

Barbara Smith may also refer to:
Barbara B. Smith (1922–2010), president of the LDS Relief Society
Barbara Dawson Smith (active since 1985), American writer
Barbara Herrnstein Smith (born 1932), American literary critic and theorist
Barbara Whiting Smith (1931–2004), American actress
Barbara McIlvaine Smith (born 1950), Pennsylvania politician
Barbara T. Smith (born 1931), American artist
Barbara Lee Smith (born 1938), mixed media artist, writer, educator, and curator
Barbara Smith Warner (born 1967), politician from the U.S. state of Oregon
B. Smith (1949–2020), American restaurateur, model, author and television host